Peter Lee Ka Kit (born May 20, 1963), Justice of the Peace, Gold GBS Bauhinia Star winner, co-chairman of Henderson Land Development and Hong Kong and China Gas Company, Ltd., is the elder son of Dr. Lee Shau Kee, the 24th on the list of Forbes World's Billionaires. He is currently a member of the Standing Committee of the 13th National Committee of the Chinese People's Political Consultative Conference and vice chairman of the All-China Federation of Industry and Commerce.

Education and early life 
Born in Hong Kong on 20 May 1963, with family roots in Shunde, Guangdong, China

Admitted to St. Paul's Primary School in 1969.

He studied and graduated from the Computer Science Department of the University of Keele in 1977.

In 1985, He joined the Henderson Land Development as the executive director, responsible for the mainland business and long-term committed to charity and public welfare undertakings

Career 
In 1985, Lee returned to Hong Kong to join Henderson Land Development. He is currently the vice chairman of Henderson Land Development, the chairman and chief executive officer of Henderson China, and the director of the Hong Kong & China Gas Company Ltd.

In addition to the business of Henderson Land Development, Lee invested a lot of time, energy and wealth in philanthropy. Lee's charity work spans throughout both China and Hong Kong. His focus is on lifting people out of poverty, helping and improving the lives of the disadvantaged and low-income families, promoting suicide prevention and arousing awareness of poverty-stricken children in mainland China. In 2008, he founded the Centum Charitas Foundation and chaired the founding committee. The foundation motivates the second and third generations of Hong Kong entrepreneurs to participate in charity work. Through the strong network of members in the business community, they called on their companies to participate in public welfare. The cooperation between the industrial and commercial sectors and the social welfare sector covers projects including the Sichuan earthquake relief, reconstruction of schools, pre-employment training for local grassroots youth, visits and assistance to disadvantaged groups.

In 2007, he founded the Peter KK Lee Care For Life Foundation.

In 2009, he joined the Ai You Foundationand is currently the vice chairman of the organization.

By 2018, the Peter KK Lee Care of Life Foundation had helped more than 20,000 impoverished childrenwith congenital heart disease undergo life-saving surgery. The foundation has also held a series of activities such as “Beijing Summer Camp”and “Chengdu Summer Camp” to meet and learn from the children and to enhance their growth.

In 2012, Lee launched a poverty alleviation program. Non-profit chain Home Convenience Stores were set up to sell food and daily necessities to low-income families, elderlies, new arrivals, ethnic minorities and other disadvantaged groups at affordable prices to reduce the disparity between the rich and the poor. To date, more than hundreds of thousands of members have benefited from this program.

Positions 
• Co-Chairman of Henderson Land Development 
• Chairman and Chief Executive Officer of Henderson China
• Co-Chairman of the Hong Kong & China Gas Company Ltd. 
• Founder & Honorary Chairman of The Centum Charitas Foundation 
• Standing Committee of the 12th & 13th  National Committee of the Chinese People's Political Consultative Conference
• Founder of Peter KK Lee Care For Life Foundation
• Vice Chairman of Ai You Foundation
• Vice Chairman of the 13th All-China Federation of Industry and Commerce
• Chairman of “One Country Two Systems Research Institute”
• Hong Kong Pei Hua Education Foundation: Vice Chairman of the Standing Committee

Recognitions and Awards 
• 2007: Awarded the first “Huang Yanpei Outstanding Contribution Award” by the China Vocational Education Association.
• 2008: Conferred as Honorary Trustee of Tsinghua University and complimented his Contributions in the “Clinton Global Action Plan” 
• July 2009: Appointed as Hong Kong Justice of the Peace (JP)
• September 2009: Awarded Honorary University Fellowship from The University of Hong Kong
• October 2012: Awarded the Order of the Knights of the French Legion of Honor (Chevalier de la Légion ďhonneur)
• January 2013: Elected as member of the 12th CPPCC Standing Committee of the People's Republic of China (Standing Committee of the CPPCC)
• July 2014: Awarded Honorary Doctor of Business Administration from the University of Edinburgh Napier (Hon DBA, Edinburgh Napier University)
• July 2015: Awarded the Hong Kong Gold GBS Bauhinia Star (GBS)

References

1963 births
Living people
Henderson Land Development
Hong Kong Buddhists
Hong Kong financial businesspeople
Hong Kong real estate businesspeople
Members of the 13th Chinese People's Political Consultative Conference
Members of the National Committee of the Chinese People's Political Consultative Conference
Members of the Election Committee of Hong Kong, 2007–2012
Members of the Election Committee of Hong Kong, 2012–2017
Members of the Election Committee of Hong Kong, 2017–2021
Recipients of the Gold Bauhinia Star